Venecia, Gomez Palacio, Durango, belongs to the Comarca Lagunera that spreads from the state of Coahuila to Durango.

Venecia, Durango was a hacienda ranch owned by Spanish immigrant family of Jose Isabel Antunez. The hacienda is now a private residence, with much of its land sold to local farmers.

Agriculture
It was very well known for its cotton, grape and corn production. Pedro Domec owned many grape producing land in Venecia, Durango.

Education
There is a university located in Venecia, Universidad Juarez, Facultad de Agricultura y Zootecnia UJED, Venecia, Durango. Carretera Gómez Palacio - Tlahualilo Km 32
Venecia, Durango, Mexico 35000

References

Populated places in Durango

Las tierras de cultivo del ejido de Venecia fue en algún momento propiedad de la señora, Luz Lourdes Lanz Duret de Suniaga.
Información subida por: (PITI) JORGE ALBERTO SANDOVAL